The Gotha Go 150 was a light aircraft designed at the German company Gothaer Waggonfabrik in the late 1930s. It was intended for civilian use, but ended up being used as a military trainer.

Development
In January 1937 Major Werner Junck, chief of the LC II, the technical wing of the Reichsluftfahrtministerium responsible for the development of new aircraft, informed various minor aircraft manufacturers such as Gothaer Waggonfabrik, Bücker, Fieseler, Flugzeugwerke Halle and Klemm that they would not get any contracts for the development of military aircraft. He therefore advised them to concentrate in the development of a Volksflugzeug or a small twin-engined plane. As a result, Gothaer Waggonfabrik developed the Go 150, while the other companies produced the Kl 105, the Si 202, the Bü 180 and the Fi 253.

The aircraft was a twin-engined monoplane with an enclosed cockpit. It was designed by Albert Kalkert, and first flew in 1937. The results of this flight were good, and production began. The aircraft was used to train both civilian and Luftwaffe pilots. The Go 150 was later also used in tests, where it was towed by a Heinkel He 46.

Specifications

References

External links

 Luftarchiv - Fieseler Fi 253</ref>

1930s German aircraft
Go 150
Twin-engined tractor aircraft
Low-wing aircraft